Mahavir Janma Kalyanak is one of the most important religious festivals in Jainism. It celebrates the birth of Mahavir, the twenty-fourth and last Tirthankara of present Avasarpiṇī. On the Gregorian calendar, the holiday occurs either in March or April.

Birth
According to Jain texts, Mahavir was born on the thirteenth day of the bright half of the moon in the month of Chaitra in the year 599 BCE (Chaitra Sud 13). Most modern historians consider Kundagram (which is today's Kundalpur in Muzaffarpur  district of Bihar) as his birthplace. Mahavir was born in a democratic kingdom (Ganarajya), Vajji, where the king was chosen by votes. Vaishali was its capital. Mahavir was named 'Vardhaman', meaning "One who grows", because of the increased prosperity in the kingdom at the time of his birth. In Vasokund, Mahavir is revered by the villagers. A place called Ahalya bhumi has not been ploughed for hundreds of years by the family that owns it, as it is considered to be the birthplace of Mahavir.

Legend
Mahavirswami was born into Ikshvaku dynasty as the son of King Siddhartha of Kundagrama and Queen Trishala. During her pregnancy, Trishala was believed to have had a number of auspicious dreams, all signifying the coming of a great soul. Digambara sect of Jainism holds that the mother saw sixteen dreams which were interpreted by the King Siddhartha. According to the Svetambara sect, the total number of auspicious dreams is fourteen. It is said that when Queen Trishala gave birth to Mahavir, Indra, the head of heavenly beings (devas) performed a ritual called abhisheka on Sumeru Parvat, this being the second of five auspicious events (Panch Kalyanakas), said to occur in the life of all Tirthankaras.

Celebrations

The idol of Lord Mahavir is carried out on a chariot, in a procession called rath yatra. On the way stavans (religious rhymes) are recited. Statues of Mahavir are given a ceremonial anointment called the abhisheka.  During the day, most members of the Jain community engage in some sort of charitable act, prayers, pujas, and vratas. Many devotees visit temples dedicated to Mahavir to meditate and offer prayers. Lectures by monks and nuns are held in temples to preach the path of virtue as defined by Jainism. Donations are collected in order to promote charitable missions like saving cows from slaughter or helping to feed poor people. Ancient Jain temples across India typically see an extremely high volume of practitioners come to pay their respects and join in the celebrations. Ahimsa runs and rallies preaching Lord Mahavir's message of Ahiṃsā (non-violence) are taken out on this day.

References

Notes

Sources

External links
History of Jainism
Lord Mahavira Sayings
The Significance of Mahavir Janma Kalyanak

See also 

Diwali (Jainism)
Jain rituals
Jain festivals
Kshamavani
God in Jainism
Parshvanatha
Digambara
Timeline of Jainism

March observances
April observances
Jain festivals